Jump Up Calypso is an album by Harry Belafonte, originally released by RCA Victor in 1961. It reached number 3 on the Billboard Pop Albums charts.

Backing musicians include The Trinidad Steel Band.

Track listing 
"Sweetheart from Venezuela" (Alexander, Gordon) – 3:28
"Go Down Emanuel Road" (Irving Burgie) – 3:07
"The Baby Boy" (Alexander, Clavery) – 3:22
"Gloria" (Gordon, Ryan) – 3:08
"Land of the Sea and Sun" (Burgie) – 2:55
"Goin' Down Jordan" (Burgie, Woods) – 3:34
"Jump in the Line" (Roberts) – 3:39
"Kingston Market" (Burgie) – 3:11
"Monkey" (Burgie, Span) – 3:58
"These Are the Times" (Burgie) – 3:14
"Bally Mena" (Burgie, Robert De Cormier) – 3:25
"Angelina" (Burgie) – 3:53

Personnel
Harry Belafonte – vocals
The Trinidad Steel Band
Ernie Calabria – guitar, quatro
Millard Thomas – guitar
Norman Keenan – bass

Production notes
Produced by Bob Bollard
Mastered by Ed Begley
Arranged by Irving Burgie
Engineered by Bob Simpson

See also
Steelpan

References

1961 albums
Harry Belafonte albums
RCA Victor albums
Albums arranged by Irving Burgie